Walter Friedrich Julius Köhler, (30 September 1897 in Weinheim – 9 January 1989 Weinheim) was Minister President of Baden, Germany during the Nazi regime. Köhler was born in Weinheim, Baden. He was known as a talented speaker and strict anti-semite. When the Nazis rose to power, Köhler served under Robert Heinrich Wagner as Minister President of Baden.

After the war, Köhler was first assessed as uninvolved with the Nazis. Later this assessment was reversed. In addition to a fine, Köhler was sentenced to three years of imprisonment. Because the time he spent in an internment camp before sentencing was included, he never had to go to prison. 

Köhler died on 9 January 1989 at the age of 91.

References
 Milde Strafen für die Täter: Heidelberg war schon früh eine Hochburg der Nationalsozialisten, Rhein-Neckar Zeitung/Nr. 261, page 13, 8 November 2008, Rhein-Neckar Zeitung GmbH

1897 births
1989 deaths
Nazi Party officials
Members of the Reichstag of Nazi Germany
People from Baden
People from Weinheim